The women's 400 metres hurdles at the 2016 European Athletics Championships took place at the Olympic Stadium on 8, 9 and 10 July.

Records

Schedule

Results

Round 1

First 2 in each heat (Q) and the next fastest 6 (q) advance to the Semifinals.

Semifinals

First 2 in each heat (Q) and the next fastest 2 (q) advance to the Final.

*Athletes who received a bye to the semifinals

Final

References

External links
 amsterdam2016.org, official championship site.

Hurdles 400 W
400 metres hurdles at the European Athletics Championships
2016 in women's athletics